The University of Cabuyao (or Pamantasan ng Cabuyao) is a university in Cabuyao, province of Laguna, Philippines. It was founded by then Mayor Etok Aguillo, through the enactment of Municipal Ordinance 2003-059 approved on April 16, 2003.

Before the establishment of the Pamantasan ng Cabuyao, there was a satellite campus of the Laguna State Polytechnic University (LSPU) at the Cabuyao National High School. The LSPU was operating through a memorandum of agreement between the LSPU president and Cabuyao municipal mayor, which commenced in  1993 and ended on March 31, 2003.

History

In late 2002, there was a strong protest against the leadership of the LSPC president from faculty members and students of LSPC. The protest was headed by Charlemagne G. Laviña and supported by Rosalia B. Pre, George Barundia, Christian Hernandez, Melissa Dimaculangan and one non-teaching staff, and some students from LSPC - CABUYAO CAMPUS.

The protest was found by the Sangguniang Bayan of Cabuyao to be true and based on facts, with the support by almost all students, most of whom were Cabuyeños. It resulted to the issuance of the Notice of Termination to the memorandum of agreement. The administration of the mayor was left with no option but to establish Cabuyao Community College.

Having anticipated the closure of LSPC-Cabuyao, faculty members headed by Charlemagne Lavina and Frank Parao assisted the office of the mayor and informed them that the Pamantasan ng Lungsod ng Maynila (PLM) is the model school for local college. Dr. Benjamin Tayabas, then PLM president, assisted Cabuyao municipality and personally attended to the work of putting up a university. He suggested that Pamantasan ng Cabuyao should be the name. On April 15, 2003 the Sanguniang Bayan enacted  Municipal Ordinance No. 2003-059. The same was approved a day after by Mayor Proceso D. Aguillo.

Pamantasan ng Cabuyao was inaugurated on July 31, 2003, the birthday of its founding mayor, and it was personally inaugurated by no less than President Gloria Macapagal Arroyo on June 19, 2003 on the occasion of the 107th birthday of Dr. Jose Rizal.

Today, under the new leadership of Hon. Isidro L. Hemedes, Jr. (the incumbent mayor) and the able assistance of Atty. Mel Gecolea (the chairperson of the Committee on Education), education reforms have been introduced, new and better systems have been put in place, and old practices have been put into sound and solid written policies and procedures.

Academic programs

List of Courses and Degree programs that Pamantasan ng Cabuyao offers to students.

Senior High School
 STEM-C (Science, Technology, Engineering, and Mathematics) majoring Computer Science/ Information Technology
 STEM-E (Science, Technology, Engineering, and Mathematics) majoring Engineering
 STEM-H (Science, Technology, Engineering, and Mathematics) majoring Health
 HUMSS (Humanities and Social Sciences)
 ABM (Accountancy, Business and Management)

College of Health and Allied Sciences
 BS in Psychology
 BS in Nursing

College of Business, Accountancy and Administration 
 BS in Accountancy
 BS in Business Administration (Majors in Financial & Marketing Management)

College of Computing and Engineering
 BS in Computer Engineering
 BS in Electronics & Communications Engineering
 BS in Industrial Engineering
 BS in Computer Science
 BS in Information Technology (Majors in Database & Web Administration)

College of Education, Arts, and Sciences
 BS in Elementary Education
 BS in Secondary Education, major in:
English
Math
Filipino
Social Studies

Graduate school
 Master of Arts in Education (major: Administration and Supervision)
 M.S. Mathematics
 Master in Business Administration
 Master in Public Administration
 Master in Business Administration (non-thesis)

School of technical and vocational education
 Computer Hardware (Computer Technology)
 Caregiving
 PC Operations
 Computer Programming
 Consumer Electronics
 Refrigeration and Air-Conditioning
 Cookery (Culinary Arts)
 Automotive

See also
 Banay-Banay, Cabuyao
 Local Colleges and Universities
 Association of Local Colleges and Universities
 Pamantasan
 Alculympics

References

External links
City of Cabuyao Official Website
Pamantasan ng Cabuyao Multiply Site
Pamantasan ng Cabuyao in Facebook

Educational institutions established in 2003
Universities and colleges in Laguna (province)
Local colleges and universities in the Philippines
Education in Cabuyao
2003 establishments in the Philippines